was a cousin and adopted son of Tsutsui Junkei, a feudal lord of the Yamato province. 
At the death of Junkei in 1584, he was relocated by Toyotomi Hideyoshi to Iga Province, where he built the Iga Ueno Castle.

In 1585, he participated at Hideyoshi Invasion of Shikoku against Chōsokabe clan.

In 1600, he took sides with the Tokugawa Ieyasu in the Battle of Sekigahara. In 1608, however, he was removed from his position by the Tokugawa shogunate, in an accusation of sloppy governance. In addition, the Tsutsui clan was forcefully abolished. The castle of Iga Ueno was accordingly taken over by Tōdō Takatora.

In 1615, Sadatsugu was ordered by the Shogunate to commit suicide on charge of his secret communication with the people of Osaka Castle during Winter Siege of Osaka. However, his son, Tsutsui Juntei was killed in action during Summer Siege of Osaka. Later, the Tsutsui clan disappeared.

References 

Samurai
1562 births
1615 deaths
Oda retainers